is a Japanese photographer. As a member of the Japanese Youth Delegation, he visited China during the Chinese-Japanese Youth Meeting in 1965.

References

Japanese photographers
1936 births
Living people
Place of birth missing (living people)
Tokyo College of Photography alumni